John O'Neill, 1st Viscount O'Neill PC (16 January 1740 – 18 June 1798) was an Irish politician.

O'Neill was the son of Charles O'Neill (died 1769), Member of Parliament for Randalstown, by Catherine Brodrick, daughter of St John Brodrick, of Midleton, County Cork.

He was returned to the Irish House of Commons for Randalstown in 1760, a seat he held until 1783, and then represented County Antrim between 1783 and 1793. He was sworn of the Irish Privy Council in 1781 and raised to the Peerage of Ireland as Baron O'Neill, of Shane's Castle in the County of Antrim, in 1793. In 1795 he was further honoured when he was made Viscount O'Neill, of Shane's Castle in the County of Antrim, in the Irish peerage.

Lord O'Neill married the Honourable Henrietta Boyle, daughter of Charles Boyle, Viscount Dungarvan, in 1777. He was killed in the Battle of Antrim during the Irish Rebellion of 1798 at the age of 58 and was succeeded in the viscountcy by his son Charles, who was created Earl O'Neill in 1800.

References

1740 births
1798 deaths
Viscounts in the Peerage of Ireland
Peers of Ireland created by George III
Members of the Privy Council of Ireland
Irish MPs 1761–1768
Irish MPs 1769–1776
Irish MPs 1776–1783
Irish MPs 1783–1790
Irish MPs 1790–1797
Members of the Parliament of Ireland (pre-1801) for County Antrim constituencies